The Battle of Darzab was to an armed conflict between Taliban soldiers, fighters of Wilayat Khorasan and soldiers of Afghan armed forces in Darzab District of Jowzjan province.

First attacks
On 9 April, four Afghan soldiers, including a unit commander, were killed in an ambush as they raced to the scene of the recent clashes in Darzab by ISIL fighters. One day after, Taliban, alongside ISIL fighters attacked Alkhani and Moghol villages of Darzab district, leaving 13 Taliban fighters dead, and 10 ISIL fighters wounded, including ISIL commander Mullah Ghanzanfar. Taliban managed to capture Alkhani, but repelled in Moghol. Separately, a Taliban commander, Faiz Mohammad was killed and one of his fighters wounded when they stormed a security post in Qush Tepa District near Darzab. A civilian woman was also killed when a militant rocket struck a home on the outskirts of the district.

Fighting between Taliban and ISIL
On 26 April, ISIL kidnapped 3 drug dealers in Darzab that were to have an opium deal with the Taliban. Taliban repeatedly asked ISIL to release the captives, but the later refused, leading the Taliban to gather forces in Darzab. After that, ISIL attacked the Taliban killing 79 Taliban fighters, wounding another 57, and capturing another 60. Among the dead Taliban fighters were three commanders,  Sheikh Hamidullah, the Taliban district chief for Qush Tapa district and Tawakkal, Shahzada Mazlomyar, and Mohibullah. One Taliban commander was also among the captured, named Haji Nokur. Also, 15 ISIL fighter killed, and 12 wounded. ISIL captured most of Darzab from Taliban, along with Qush Tapa during the fighting.

Aftermath
In 2018, the Taliban launched a major operation to take over the Darzab District and the surrounding districts from IS-KP. The battle was fought for 2 weeks and 6 days until following heavy clashes, IS-KP was defeated, with most of the group's forces in Jowzjan Province killed or captured. 3 out of the 4 IS-KP commanders surrendered to the Taliban. They killed Haji Murad, one of the IS-KP commanders at the battle and who was the Islamic State's deputy commander for Jowzjan. Taliban commander Mullah Burjan was executed and Haji Shakir was killed in action. At the end of the battle, more than 200 militants surrendered to the Taliban.

References

2017 in Afghanistan
Darzab (2017)
Darzab
Darzab (2017)
Military operations involving the Islamic State of Iraq and the Levant
April 2017 events in Afghanistan